Markus Kramer is a brand management professional and honorary visiting professor in Strategic Brand Management at Cass Business School. He is also the author of "The Guiding Purpose Strategy: a Navigational Code for Brand Growth" and coinventor and editor of the Responsible Investment Brand Index (RIBI).

Education and career
Kramer holds degrees from the Berkeley University of California and the University of Oxford.

Kramer started his career in architecture before pivoting into brand and marketing. His career includes executive roles at Harley-Davidson motor company and Aston Martin Lagonda. Since 2013 Kramer is managing director of Swiss and London based Brand Affairs.

Publications
Kramer has published a book on how Purpose acts as a catalyst for growth. The book is in its second edition and presents in popular science format research on the transformational power of purpose with a focus on brand management, organizational and economic growth.

Kramer is co-inventor and editor of the annual Responsible Investment Brand Index (RIBI) assessing the asset management industry on its ability to convey commitment to responsible investing through branding principles. The index is in its third edition.

Bibliography

References

Living people
University of California alumni
Alumni of the University of Oxford
Harley-Davidson executives
Branding consultants
Year of birth missing (living people)